Eighty Eight is an unincorporated community in Barren County, Kentucky, United States. It is part of the Glasgow Micropolitan Statistical Area and is 10 miles east of Glasgow on State Highway 90. The community's biggest claim to fame was the celebration of August 8, 1988 (08/08/88). People with an affinity for the number 8 descended upon the town from various parts of the nation and world, and the celebration was televised on national television. A similar celebration was held August 8, 2008 (08/08/08). National media coverage this time was usurped by the 2008 Summer Olympics.

Name 
As reported in an article in The New York Times, the community was named in 1860 by Dabnie Nunnally, the community's first postmaster. He had little faith in the legibility of his handwriting, and thought that using numbers would solve the problem. He then reached into his pocket and came up with 88 cents. Another explanation is that the hamlet is 8.8 miles from Glasgow.

The only store in this small community was opened and run by the Richardson Brothers. It was the main source for feed, grocery, hardware and farm needs. It was closed in the late 1980s. The building was restored in 2005 and reopened as the Eighty Eight General Store. The historic post office (Zip Code 42130) was kept intact and is now open to the public. It is no longer in service however and was discontinued in 1984.

Culture 
Eighty Eight is home to a congregation of the Church of Christ.  Although sometimes mistakenly called Eighty Eight Church of Christ, the proper name is Refuge Church of Christ.

See also
 List of places with numeric names

References

Unincorporated communities in Barren County, Kentucky
Unincorporated communities in Kentucky
Glasgow, Kentucky, micropolitan area